John Lewis Tiarks, FRS (born Johann Ludwig Tiarks, 10 May 1789 – 1 May 1837) was the British astronomer to the North American Boundary Line Commission.

Tiarks was born in the town of Jever, then in the Grand Duchy of Oldenburg, and now in Lower Saxony, Germany. He entered the University of Göttingen to study theology but transferred to the mathematics course. Having gained his degree he initially moved to Hamburg, but then moved to England in 1810 to escape Napoleon. There he secured employment as Assistant Librarian to Sir Joseph Banks.

In 1817, with the help of Banks, he was appointed British Astronomer to the Boundary Commission created by the Treaty of Ghent in 1814 to resolve the border between the United States and Canada westward from the Great Lakes to the Rockies. Between 1818 and 1821 he carried out a number of specific surveys along the proposed border. He married in 1822 and returned to England.

Due to delays in proceeding with the border project, the British Admiralty asked him in the meantime to determine the longitude of various European locations, such as Madeira, with the help of chronometers, for which the SS Comet had been specially outfitted. He was joined from 30 June to 17 August 1824 by Humphry Davy who used the voyage to Norway to test his zinc protectors for ships' bottoms. In 1825 Tiarks was elected a Fellow of the Royal Society as "a person well versed in mathematics and nautical astronomy".

In 1825 he was sent again to North America to ascertain the co-ordinates of the most north-westerly point of the Lake of the Woods, enduring many privations in that remote wilderness. On completion he returned to England to be sent in 1828 to the Netherlands, where the King of the Netherlands was arbitrating on the border issue.

In 1835 his health broke down and he died in 1837 at age 48.

References

External links
 Dictionary of Canadian Biography
 Johann Ludwig Tiarks on tiarks.co.uk

1789 births
1837 deaths
British surveyors
Fellows of the Royal Society